Almăjel may refer to several villages in Romania:

 Almăjel, a district in the town of Filiaşi, Dolj County
 Almăjel, a village in Vlădaia Commune, Mehedinţi County